The dwarf free-tailed bat (Mops nanulus) is a species of bat in the family Molossidae. It is found in Cameroon, Democratic Republic of the Congo, Ivory Coast, Ethiopia, Ghana, Guinea, Kenya, Nigeria, Sierra Leone, South Sudan, and Uganda. Its natural habitats are subtropical or tropical dry forests and subtropical or tropical moist lowland forests.

Taxonomy
It was described as a new species in 1917 by American zoologist Joel Asaph Allen. The holotype was collected in Niangara, Democratic Republic of the Congo by Herbert Lang and James Chapin.

Description

References

Mops (bat)
Taxonomy articles created by Polbot
Mammals described in 1917
Bats of Africa
Taxa named by Joel Asaph Allen